Calcutta Customs Club is an Indian institutional multi-sports club based in Kolkata, West Bengal, which is known for its association football section, that competes in the Calcutta Football League.

History
The club was established in 1892 as an institutional club of Calcutta Customs (now known as 'Kolkata Customs'). During the British rule in India, they achieved success at the IFA Shield, in which the club gained runner-up position in 1908, 1909, 1915, and 1939. In the Calcutta Football League season of 2021–22, Calcutta Customs was managed by Biswajit Bhattacharya.

Honours

Association football
 IFA Shield
Runners-up (4): 1908, 1909, 1915, 1939
 Sikkim Gold Cup
Runners-up (1): 2017
Manik Upadhayay Memorial Trophy
Champions (1): 2022

Other departments
Calcutta Customs has its field hockey and cricket divisions since its foundation. Club's cricket team participates in the tournaments of the Cricket Association of Bengal, and competes in the Second Division League.

Field hockey
The hockey team of Calcutta Customs is affiliated with the Bengal Hockey Association, and competes in the Calcutta Hockey League and Beighton Cup, one of the oldest field hockey tournaments in the world. The hockey team is among the most successful clubs in domestic tournaments, especially during the pre-independence years when Anglo-Indians used to dominate field hockey.

Honours
 Calcutta Hockey League
Champions (18): 1909, 1910, 1912, 1913, 1921, 1922, 1926, 1927, 1930, 1931, 1932, 1933, 1936, 1937, 1938, 1939, 1950, 1961
 Beighton Cup
Champions (12): 1908, 1909, 1910, 1912, 1925, 1926, 1930, 1931, 1932, 1935, 1938, 1965
Runners-up (10): 1915, 1916, 1922, 1923, 1927, 1928, 1929, 1933, 1936, 1939
 Bombay Gold Cup
Runners-up (1): 1964
 Aga Khan Gold Cup
 Runners-up (1): 1932

Cricket
The men's cricket section of Calcutta Customs is affiliated to the Cricket Association of Bengal (CAB), and participate in regional tournaments such as First Division League, and J.C. Mukherjee T-20 Trophy.

Volleyball
Calcutta Custom's volleyball section participates in the West Bengal State Senior Volleyball Championship.

See also
 Football in Kolkata
 List of football clubs in India

References

Further reading

External links

 Calcutta Customs Club at the-AIFF.com
 Calcutta Customs Club at Soccerway

Football clubs in Kolkata
Association football clubs established in 1892
1892 establishments in India
Works association football clubs in India